Anneke Eussen is a contemporary artist in fields of drawing, sculpture and photography and installation. Eussen was born in Netherlands 1978 and currently lives and works in Berlin.

Eussen won Young Artists On The Road Award in 2003 and was nominated with Parkstad Limburg Prijs 2004.

Solo exhibitions 

2017 
 Vertical Horizon, Tatjana Pieters, Ghent (BE)
2015 
 New Art Section, Art Rotterdam, with Galerie Tatjana Pieters, Rotterdam (NL) 
2014 
 Circle lines, Cruise & Callas, Berlin (DE)
 Solo, selected by Katerina Gregos, Art Brussels, with Galerie Tatjana Pieters, Brussels (BE) 
 As It Is, Galerie Tatjana Pieters, Ghent (BE)
2013
 Presentation of new work & artist book, Zebrastraat, Ghent (BE)
 NEUBAU Stuck, LSD Galerie, Berlin (DE)
 Verbannter Fehlgeschmack, LSD Galerie, Berlin (DE)
2012
 Close to what's real, Highlight Gallery, San Francisco (USA) Palast, palästchen, ..., Galerie Tatjana Pieters, Ghent (BE)
2011
 the loser project invited by Rui Duarte, showroom, Berlin (DE)
2010
 Joyride, Galerie Petra Vankova, Berlin (DE)
2009
 Double De Luxe, Galerie Tatjana Pieters, Gent (BE)
2007
 Bildmuseet Umeå (SE)
 Indefinite Reflections, De Bond, Brugge (BE)
 Rise and shin,e Onetwenty, Gent (BE)
2006
 Lucky me!, Onetwenty Gallery, Gent (BE)
2003
 Threats/treats, Suermondt Ludwig Museum, Achen (DE)

Group exhibitions 
2015 
 Listen to the stones, think like a mountain, Galerie Tatjana Pieters, Ghent (BE) 
2014 
 Tuinfeest (auction), Museum Dhont-Dhaenens (BE)
 Paperworks, Galerie Tatjana Pieters, Ghent (BE)
 BORG 2014 Biennal event for contemporary art, Antwerp (BE) Gallery Weekend Berlin, LSD Galerie, Berlin, (DE)
2013 
 Private Collection Selected by #1, Galerie Tatjana Pieters, Ghent (BE)
 Nightshop, Anneke Eussen & Tamara Van San, with Galerie Tatjana Pieters, Knokke (BE) 
 Pounds, Shillings, Pence, LSD Galerie, Berlin (DE)
2012 
 Secret Postcards, Jan Van Eyck Academie, Maastricht (NL) 
 Schriftuur - Scripture, CC De Bond Bruges (BE)
 Cognitio Arsphobiae, The Wand, Berlin (DE)
2011 
 Change of Address, Opening of the New Space, Galerie Tatjana Pieters, Ghent (BE)
2010
 A selection of contemporary art, Joanna Seikaly Gallery, Beiroet, Libanon
 Mythe Berlijn, cur. Peter Fransman Ainsi building Maastricht (NL)
 Collage Accident, Forgotten Bar, Berlin (DE)
 Young collectors #2, Sign in Groningen (NL)
2009
 Rites de Passage, cur.by Pier Luigi Tazzi & and Rich Jacobs, Schunck Glaspaleis Heerlen (NL)
 Art Forum Berlin September, Tatjana Pieters Gent (NL)
2008
 STAND, Oostende, (BE) organized by: De Expeditie / Amsterdam DOMOBAAL
 London Tatjana Pieters/OneTwenty
 Glocal Affairs, Maastricht (NL)
 Art Forum Berlin, Germany, represented by Tatjana Peiters Onetwenty, Gent (BE)
 Art Rotterdam, Onetwenty-Tatjana Pieters (BE)
 Artrepco 3+3, Zurich (CH)
 Onetwenty-Tatjana Pieters, 3+3, Gent (BE)
2007
 Stadsgalerij Heerlen, Kunstsupermarkt, Heerlen, (BE)
 Art-Brussels, Onetwenty Gallery (BE)
 Art-Rotterdam, Onetwenty Gallery (BE)
2006
 Art Brussels, Onetwenty Gallery (BE)
 Extiem Poezie-zomer, Watou (BE)
2005
 And Lucy liked it....., Hisk Antwerp (BE)
 Tradis, Ename (BE)
 Fresco, De Fabriek Eindhoven (NL)
 Drawings+, Grusenmeyer Gallery, Deurle (BE)
 Convoi Exceptionnel, Antwerp (BE)
2004
 Stadsgalerij Heerlen (NL), Parkstad Limburg Prijs
 Open studios HISK, Antwerp (BE)
 Project: Picture of the month (NL) & Scotland (UK)
2002
 Images of desire2, Amsterdam (NL)
 Art Primeur 2002, Pictura, Dordrecht (NL)
2001
 Manifest, CK, Roermond (NL)
 Thuis, Marres, Maastricht (NL)
 Charlemagne, Ludwig Forum, Achen (DE)

Collections 
 Collection Dutch ministry of internal affairs (Tokyo dreaming 02 & Porcelain boy), 2008.
 Collection Dutch ministry of internal affairs (Blue boy 2006, colour pencil drawing 100x100 cm), 2007.

Publications 
2014 
Anneke Eussen, Touching Material, artist book
2012
 Conversaties/Conversations, Cultuur Centrum Brugge, Die keure Brugge, Bruges (BE), (p. 11).
2010 
 Zuiderlucht NL: “Aan de lopende band van de tijd”, photographs and writings from my stay in Helsinki, in Zuiderlucht NL nr. 1 pp. 16.
 Anneke eussen, Wildfremd, Selected works 2005 -2010, (BE)
2008 
 Where are you, glocal affairs. Huis voor de kunsten, Limburg, pp. 55
 Inde nite Re ections, Anneke Eussen, De Bond Brugge, Bruges (BE)
2007 
 Color Pencil 2006–2007, Anneke Eussen, s.n.
 Johan Debruyne, 'Anneke Eussen in De Bond Brugge'
 Contemporary Art in Belgium 2007, Bart De Baere, Best of Publishing, Vorst (BE), (p. 234).
2006 
 Anneke van Antwerpen, just like today, Ghent
 Extiem, Watou Poëziezomer 2006, pp. 90.
 Huwelijk tussen kunst, landschap en poëzie, Terminus vrijdag
2005 
 Van Der Meiren Jean-Pierre, Enama Actueel Tardis, (p. 32-35),Ename, (BE)
 ...And Lucky liked it!, HISH Gent, Ghent, (BE)
2003 
 Threats/Treats, Anneke Eussen, Drukkerij Thoma, Vaals (NL)

Grants and prizes 
 2004 Nomination Parkstad Limburg Prize 
 2003 Winner Young Artists on the Road Award

References

External links 
 
 

Living people
1978 births
Artists from Berlin
Dutch contemporary artists
People from Kerkrade